Indirect presidential elections were held in Brazil on 3 October 1966 through an electoral college system. It was the second election during the Brazilian military government, with Artur da Costa e Silva as the sole candidate. Costa e Silva was elected with 295 votes from the ruling National Renewal Alliance Party (ARENA).

Background 
During the rule of Castelo Branco, several Institutional Acts were amended, increasing the power of military regime. The elections scheduled for 1965 were delayed to 1966.

The elections were the first after various changes in domestic politics. Following various cessations of political rights, Juscelino Kubitschek, Adhemar de Barros, Carlos Lacerda and Jânio Quadros, the main political leaders, were proscribed after allegations of conspiracy and corruption. Once again, the National Congress of Brazil elected the president. The vice-presidential candidacy was linked with the candidacy of the presidency. Only two political parties were legal at the time. However, the opposition party did not put forward a candidate.

Results

References

Presidential elections in Brazil
Brazil
Presidential
October 1966 events in South America